The 1970 U.S. Pro Tennis Championships – Doubles was an event of the 1970 U.S. Pro Tennis Championships men's tennis tournament played on outdoor hard courts at the Longwood Cricket Club in Boston, United States from August 3 through August 9, 1970. The draw consisted of 16 teams. Roy Emerson and Rod Laver won the doubles title, defeating Ismail El Shafei and Ismail El Shafei in the final, 6–1, 7–6.

Draw

Finals

References

U.S. Pro Tennis Championships
Doubles